Ali Attalah Obeidi was an Air Marshall Brigadier in the army of former Libyan leader Muammar Gaddafi until the 2011 Libyan civil war when he defected to the opposition in April. The Anti-Gaddafi forces showed a video of him, to prove this defection. In the tape he says he quit because Gaddafi gave orders to kill civilians and as he did not want the blood of his own people on his hands. It is claimed  the former general walked for fifteen days from Tripoli to the besieged city of Misrata. Obeidi claimed he had escaped from Mitaga air base to join the NTC.

Death

When rebels were advancing from Dafniya, a town in the west of Libya, Ali Obeidi was killed along with eighteen others on 6 July. He was considered one of the top commanders in Misrata on the western front.

References

2011 deaths
Libyan generals
Libyan military personnel killed in action
People killed in the First Libyan Civil War
Year of birth missing